The northern brush-tailed phascogale (Phascogale pirata), also known as the northern brush-tailed wambenger or northern brush-tailed mousesack is a species of marsupial in the family Dasyuridae. It is endemic to northern Australia.

References

Mammals described in 1904
Dasyuromorphs